Steven Terrell (born September 21, 1990) is a former American football safety after playing in the league for five seasons. He played college football at Texas A&M University and attended Allen High School in Allen, Texas. He has also been a member of the Jacksonville Jaguars, Houston Texans, Seattle Seahawks, and Kansas City Chiefs.

Early years
Terrell played high school football for the Allen High School Eagles. The Eagles won the 2008 5A Division I State Championship during his senior year. He was also named first-team All-State by the TSWA, All-State by the Associated Press, honorable mention Academic All-State (THSCA) and All-District (8-5A) at defensive back. He recorded 122 tackles, blocked five kicks, and intercepted two passes as a senior.

College career
Terrell was a four-year letterman for the Texas A&M Aggies from 2009 to 2012. He played in 52 games, starting 24, during his college career while recording totals of 139 tackles, four interceptions, two forced fumbles, and one fumble recovery for the Aggies. He was a team captain his senior year in 2012. Terrell was also named first-team Academic All-Big 12 and first-team Academic All-Southeastern Conference. He graduated from Texas A&M with a bachelor's degree in Sports Management / Business Administration.

Professional career

Jacksonville Jaguars
Terrell was signed by the Jacksonville Jaguars on April 29, 2013, after going undrafted in the 2013 NFL Draft. He was released by the Jaguars on August 30, 2013. He was signed to the Jaguars' practice squad on September 4, 2013.

Houston Texans
Terrell signed with the Houston Texans on December 30, 2013. He was released by the Texans on May 14, 2014.

Seattle Seahawks
Terrell was signed by the Seattle Seahawks on July 26, 2014. He was released by the Seahawks on August 30 and signed to the team's practice squad on August 31, 2014. He was promoted to the active roster on October 18, 2014. Terrell was active during the Seahawks' loss to the New England Patriots in Super Bowl XLIX.

Kansas City Chiefs
On July 6, 2017, Terrell signed with the Kansas City Chiefs. He was released on September 2, 2017, and re-signed on September 9, 2017. He was placed on injured reserve on December 11, 2017, after suffering an injury while intercepting a pass from Derek Carr.

Tennessee Titans
On August 10, 2018, Terrell signed with the Tennessee Titans. He was released on September 1, 2018.

Retirement
After being released by the Titans and playing for five season, Terrell has retired from the NFL. He has settled down with his wife, Kayla, and became a realtor in his hometown of Allen, Texas.

References

External links
NFL Draft Scout
Jacksonville Jaguars profile

Living people
1990 births
People from Allen, Texas
Players of American football from Texas
American football safeties
African-American players of American football
Texas A&M Aggies football players
Jacksonville Jaguars players
Houston Texans players
Seattle Seahawks players
Kansas City Chiefs players
Tennessee Titans players
21st-century African-American sportspeople